Mitrella eximia is a species of sea snail in the family Columbellidae, the dove snails.

Description
The shell size varies between 6 mm and 12 mm.

Distribution
This species is found in the Red Sea and along Malaysia and the Philippines

References

 Vine, P. (1986). Red Sea Invertebrates. Immel Publishing, London. 224 pp

eximia
Gastropods described in 1846